Greater Kuala Lumpur is the geographical term that determines the boundaries of Metropolitan Kuala Lumpur in Malaysia. Though similar to the term "Klang Valley", there remains a variation between the two. It is similar to Greater London and Greater Toronto. The metropolitan area covers  5,194.72 square km of land.

History
Before 1974, when Kuala Lumpur was still part of Selangor, there was once a greater Kuala Lumpur district covering what is today the Federal Territory of Kuala Lumpur, Ampang, Batu Caves, Gombak, Ulu Klang, Petaling Jaya, Puchong and Sungai Buloh.

Definition
Greater Kuala Lumpur is conterminous to the National Growth Conurbation, which spans the Klang Valley, western Negeri Sembilan to the south, and the topographically mountainous western frontier of Pahang to the east. It is defined as an area covered by 14 municipalities surrounding Kuala Lumpur, each governed by local authorities:

The Klang Valley (Selangor and the Federal Territories of Kuala Lumpur and Putrajaya) 
 Kuala Lumpur City Hall (DBKL)
 Perbadanan Putrajaya (PPj)
 Shah Alam City Council (MBSA)
 Petaling Jaya City Council (MBPJ)
 Klang Municipal Council (MPK)
 Kajang Municipal Council (MPKJ)
 Subang Jaya City Council (MBSJ)
 Selayang Municipal Council (MPS)
 Ampang Jaya Municipal Council (MPAJ)
 Kuala Langat Municipal Council (MPKL)
 Sepang Municipal Council (MPSp) consisting of Cyberjaya/Salak Tinggi/Kuala Lumpur International Airport

Malaysia Vision Valley (MVV), western Negeri Sembilan
 Seremban City Council (MBS)
 Port Dickson Municipal Council (MPPD)

Bentong District, western Pahang
 Bentong Municipal Council (MPB)

Usage
Greater KL is a relatively new term as compared to the more prevalent and established Klang Valley term.

Statistics
In 2010, the Greater KL population was estimated at close to seven million and it contributed about RM263 billion to the nation's Gross National Income (GNI). Kuala Lumpur ranks 79th out of 140 cities in the Economist Intelligence Unit's survey on liveability.

Cities/towns/areas within  Greater Kuala Lumpur

Gallery

References 

Geography of Malaysia
K